HMS Sun Prize was a 22-gun sixth rate take by HMS Litchfield on 13 May 1704. She was registered as a Royal Navy Vessel on 1 July 1704. She was commissioned into the Royal Navy in 1704 for service in the English Channel. She was recaptured by a French 36-gun privateer off St Albans Head in 1708.

Sun Prize (actually spelt Sunn Prize or Sunn) was the third named ship since it was used for a 12-gun vessel with Sir Humphrey Gilbert in 1682 and lost in 1683.

Specifications
She was captured on 13 May 1704 and registered on 1 July 1704. Her tonnage calculation was  tons. Her armament was eighteen sakers and four minions all on wooden trucks.

Commissioned Service
She was commissioned in 1704 under the command of Captain John Bennet, RN for service in the English Channel. In 1706 Commander J. Grayham, RN took command followed by Commander John Wood, RN on 20 January 1707. In 1708 Commander Andrew Ley, RN took over command.

Disposition
She was taken by the French 36-gun privateer Le Duc de Vendome off St Albans Head, Dorset on 17 January 1708. She suffered 2 dead, 1 missing and twelve wounded during the engagement.

Citations

References
 Winfield, British Warships in the Age of Sail (1603 – 1714), by Rif Winfield, published by Seaforth Publishing, England © 2009, EPUB , Chapter 6, The Sixth Rates, Vessels acquired from 18 December 1688, Sixth Rates of 20 guns and up to 26 guns, Ex-French Prizes (1704–09), Sun Prize
 Colledge, Ships of the Royal Navy, by J.J. Colledge, revised and updated by Lt Cdr Ben Warlow and Steve Bush, published by Seaforth Publishing, Barnsley, Great Britain, © 2020, e  (EPUB), Section S (Sunn Prize)

 

1700s ships
Corvettes of the Royal Navy
Naval ships of the United Kingdom